Andrewesinulus is a genus of beetles in the family Carabidae, containing the following species:

 Andrewesinulus enganensis (Straneo, 1938)
 Andrewesinulus gibbus (Andrewes, 1931)
 Andrewesinulus ovum (Alluaud, 1897)
 Andrewesinulus singularis (Andrewes, 1929)
 Andrewesinulus vadoni Jeannel, 1948

References

Pterostichinae